Events from the year 1595 in art.

Events

Paintings

Caravaggio
The Musicians
Saint Francis of Assisi in Ecstasy
Bacchus
Annibale Carracci – Venus, Adonis and Cupid (approximate date)
Lavinia Fontana – Portrait of a Lady with Lap Dog (approximate date)
Marcus Gheeraerts the Younger (attributed) – Portrait of an unknown lady, possibly Lettice Knollys, Countess of Leicester (approximate date) (Tate Britain)
Nicholas Hilliard – Portrait miniature of Lettice Knollys, Countess of Leicester (c.1590-1595)
Fabrizio Santafede – Madonna with Saints

Births
April 6 - Pieter de Molijn, Dutch Golden Age painter and engraver born in England (died 1661)
July 4 - Felix Castello, Spanish painter (died 1651)
October 18 - Lucas van Uden, Flemish Baroque painter specializing in landscapes (died 1672)
date unknown
Francesco Carracci, Italian painter and engraver (died 1622)
Lucas Vorsterman, Dutch Baroque engraver (died 1675)
probable
Vincenzo Spisanelli, Italian painter of altarpieces (died 1662)
Tomás Yepes, Spanish painter of primarily bodegóns (died 1674)
Jan den Uyl, Dutch Golden Age painter of still lifes (died 1640)
Dirck van Baburen, Dutch painter (died 1624)
Pieter de Keyser, Dutch Golden Age sculptor and architect (died 1676)
Jan Wildens, Flemish Baroque painter and draughtsman specializing in landscapes (died 1653)
1595/1596: Simon de Passe, Dutch royal engraver and designer of medals (died 1647)

Deaths
July 26 - Augustin Cranach, German painter, son of Lucas Cranach the Younger (born 1554)
date unknown
Robert Adams, English architect, engraver and surveyor of buildings to Queen Elizabeth (born 1540)
Michelangelo Aliprandi, Italian painter, pupil of Veronese (born 1527)
Alessandro Ardente, Italian painter during the late-Renaissance period (date of birth unknown)
Annibale Caccavello, Italian sculptor (born 1515)
Jean Cousin the Younger, French painter, sculptor (born 1522)
Hernando de Ávila, Spanish painter and sculptor (born 1538)
Pedro de Bolduque, Spanish sculptor of Flemish origin (born 1550)
Étienne Delaune, French engraver and goldsmith (born 1518)
Ercole Procaccini the Elder, Italian painter (born 1520)

 
Years of the 16th century in art